Dunshaughlin (Irish: Domhnach Seachnaill) is a Gaelic Athletic Association club based in the town of Dunshaughlin, in County Meath, Ireland. The club competes at intermediate level in the Football championship. Formed in 1886, it is one of the oldest still-active clubs in Meath.

History
The first reported game was against Ross on 30 January 1987 which St. Seachnall’s won by 1-2 to 0-0. The club has since won many championships at Junior and Intermediate level.

The club was initially a hurling club and maintained its roots in the game until the 1980s.

In 2010 Dunshaughlin senior team lost by a point against Summerhill in the Meath Senior Football Championship final.

Honours
Meath Senior Football Championships: 3
 2000, 2001, 2002
Meath Senior Hurling Championships: 3
 1909, 1910, 1923
Leinster Senior Club Football Championship: 1
 2002
 Meath Intermediate Football Championship: 3
 1977, 1997, 2022
 Meath Junior Football Championship: 3
 1928, 1950, 1958
 Meath Junior B Football Championship: 3
 1958, 1994, 2012

External links

Gaelic games clubs in County Meath